Ambatofinandrahana is a municipality in Ambatofinandrahana District in central Madagascar.

It is a part of Amoron'i Mania region.

Geography 
This town lies at the Route nationale 35 from Morondava to Ivato at 67 km from Ivato.

Nature
The protected area of the Massif d'Itremo.

Geology
The only quartzite and marble quarries of Madagascar are found within 40km from this town and there are found 7 qualities:  green, pink, brown, cream, blue pastel, white and black.

References

Populated places in Amoron'i Mania
Geological type localities